Goin' All Out is a smooth jazz album by saxophonist Eric Darius. Released on June 24, 2008, this album is Darius' fourth, but his first released through Blue Note Records. The album peaked at #9 on Billboard's Top Contemporary Jazz chart, staying on the chart for over 5 months. The album's single release, "Goin' All Out", peaked at #1 on Billboard's Smooth Jazz Songs chart during the week of October 25, 2008.

Track listing
All songs written by Barkulis, Darius, Floyd, King, and Otano except where listed.
"Just Like That" – 3:34
"Because of You" – 4:30 (Eriksen, Hermansen, Smith)
"Just for the Moment" – 3:55 (Darius)
"Goin' All Out" – 4:11 (Darren Rahn, Darius)
"Be Without You" – 4:08 (Austin, Blige, Cox, Perry)
"Vibe with Me" – 4:10
"Feelin' da Rhythm" – 3:56
"Ain't No Doubt About It" – 4:23 (Darius, Rahn, Tedeschi)
"Unconditional" – 3:51
"Breathe" – 4:32 (Rahn, Darius)

References

External links
[ Billboard.com: Album Review]

2008 albums